PTSD: Post Traumatic Stress Disorder is the fourth studio album by American hip hop artist Pharoahe Monch, released on April 15, 2014 under his independent label, W.A.R. Media, in partnership with INgrooves. The album features guest appearances from Black Thought, Talib Kweli, Denaun, The Stepkids and Vernon Reid, as well as production from Lee Stone, Marco Polo, Jesse West and Quelle Chris amongst others. The album was promoted by two Lee Stone-produced singles: "Damage" and "Bad M.F.".

Background
In PTSD: Post Traumatic Stress Disorder, Pharoahe Monch continues the story he began telling in his previous LP, W.A.R. (We Are Renegades) (2011) — his third studio album and first independent release. The Queens emcee narrates, in both literal and metaphoric ways, about the trials and tribulations of an independent artist who is at war with the music industry and the struggle of the black male experience in America. In 2012, during an interview with Shawn Setaro, host of the podcast The Cipher, the rapper explained the connections between the two projects, beyond their titles. "The W.A.R. album was like, I'm going to battle against the machine, I'm doing this independently. I'm putting some things out that I learned and I'm going to expose about the music industry. PTSD is the result of me doing that, where I am emotionally now. It's similar to how someone comes back, from war and is stricken by re-adjusting to a regular situation."

Monch told MTV Hive that PTSD is "more mental, emotional and personal" because it came out of the depths of a period of depression.  He also gave the internal and external factors that helped him create the album. "I was working on the title track, which took me to a point in between Internal Affairs and Desire, where I was heavily depressed. Through the waiting period, the industry period, and going through a lot emotionally. Then there was the physical [problem] with the asthma. It was the worst. So I started off with that title track and my manager was like, 'Yo, let's really dive into that state and how you got to where you are now, and how this follows what people go through to get back to a so-called 'normal' situation'."

The concept album follows a veteran through combat experience, his return home, relationship dissolution, drug addiction, painful depression, and, finally, a triumphant but realistically rendered decision to keep living and struggling.

Some of the lyrics to "The Jungle" date to at least 2001, when Monch performed the first verse of the song live on Tim Westwood's BBC Radio 1 show.

Singles and promotion
On September 27, 2012, the lead single entitled "Damage", produced by Lee Stone, was released. It represents the final chapter of his anti-gun violence trilogy of songs he has written from a bullet's perspective, starting with "Stray Bullet," which appeared on Organized Konfusion's 1994 album, Stress: The Extinction Agenda, which was followed by "When the Gun Draws" from his second solo album, Desire (2007).

Originally intended to be an EP, PTSD was later changed to a full-length studio album. It was reported that Pharoahe Monch would be doing an Album Release Tour for PTSD in April 2013 with dates in Australia, and New Zealand.

The album was intended to be released in Fall 2012, but no official release date was given until January 2014. In an interview for Crazy Al Cayne TV, at the A3C HipHop Festival in November 2013, Pharoahe said that he was putting the finishing touches on his new album and had the intention to release it in January 2014. On January 29, 2014, it was reported that the project was set to be released on April 15, 2014. On that same date, Pharoahe released the album's second single entitled "Bad MF", which is produced by Lee Stone. On March 18, 2014, the rapper unveiled the cover art for his forthcoming album. He also released a trailer in support of his project, which includes footage from his recent United Kingdom tour.

Critical reception 

PTSD was met with critical acclaim. At Metacritic, which assigns a normalized rating out of 100 to reviews from critics, the album received an average score of 78, based on 9 critics, indicating "generally favorable reviews". In a positive review, Del F. Cowie of Exclaim! wrote "Monch's cavernous vocabulary, internal rhymes, precise delivery and thought-provoking metaphors; they remain undiminished 20 years after Organized Konfusion's landmark Stress: The Extinction Agenda." Roman Cooper of HipHopDX wrote "Much like with W.A.R. and Desire, P.T.S.D. seeks to accomplish more than just keep Pharoahe's spot on the criminally-underrated lists warm; instead, it makes a case for placing him among the Chuck Ds and Ice Cubes as one of Hip Hop's sharpest social voices." XXL reviewer Barry Ward noted "Rhyming at a skillful pace with lyrics that get straight to the point has never been an issue for Monch, and he shows no signs of rust on the album." Kyle Kramer of Pitchfork Media wrote "for the most part, Pharoahe [is] creating some of the more emotionally incisive and grounded music of his career." Zach 'Goose' Gase, writing for RapReviews, observed that "Pharoahe Monch has always been among the most talented rappers in the game, and now with 'PTSD,' he has an album that showcases not only his lyrical prowess, but also his ability to craft a fully focused and theme driven album." In a mixed review, Nathan Stevens of PopMatters wrote "The album's structure collapses under its own weight thanks to questionable production and a plot that never becomes cohesive. Still, Monch's bars are among the best in the game. Put his words over shoestring production and your jaw would still drop."

Track listing

Notes
"Damage" borrows, in the hook, a line from "Mama Said Knock You Out" as performed by LL Cool J.

Personnel
Credits for PTSD: Post Traumatic Stress Disorder adapted from AllMusic.

 B.A.M. – producer
 Nick Banns –  engineer, mixing, producer, string arrangements, strings
 Boogie Blind – producer
 Cullen Brooks – vocal engineer
 Marco "Marco Polo" Bruno – mixing, producer
 Brian Cid – engineer, mixing engineer
 Michael Ciro – drums, engineer, guitar
 Alby Cohen – engineer
 Denaun – featured artist
 Dr. Pete – featured artist
 Dan Edinberg – engineer, mixing, primary artist, producer
 Ashley Grier – vocals
 Tsidi Ibrahim – composer
 Troy "Pharoahe Monch" Jamerson – executive producer, primary artist, producer
 Jeff Gitelman – engineer, mixing, primary artist, producer
 King of Chill – engineer
 Ola Kudu – artwork, cover design
 Dave Kutch – mastering
 Talib "Talib Kweli" Greene – featured artist
 Alex Merzin – editing, mixing
 Joe Nardone – mixing
 Quelle Chris – producer
 Guy Routte – executive producer
 Clara Inés Schuhmacher – vocals
 Jesse Singer – engineer, mixing, producer
 Chris Soper –  engineer, mixing, producer
 The Stepkids – featured artist
 Lee Stone – mixing, producer
 Tariq "Black Thought" Trotter – featured artist
 Tim Walsh – engineer, mixing, primary artist, producer
 Jesse West – producer
 Christopher Willcocks – cover photo

Charts

References

External links
 Pharaohe Monch Official Website
 W.A.R. Media Official Website

2014 albums
Concept albums
Pharoahe Monch albums
Albums produced by Quelle Chris
Hip hop albums by American artists